The Ca' de Sass (Lombard name; literally "house of stone") is a monumental 19th century building in Milan, Italy, located close to the city centre, at numbers 6 and 8 of Via Monte di Pietà. It used to be the headquarters of Cariplo, a former Italian bank, now merged into Intesa Sanpaolo.

The design of the building by architect Giuseppe Balzaretto, began in 1868. Balzaretto's design was largely inspired by the architecture of Palazzo Strozzi in Florence, and by Renaissance bank buildings in general. Construction of the building was completed in 1872.

The external walls of the buildings are rusticated, with mullions and terraces.

References
 Attilia Lanza, Milano e i suoi palazzi:Porta Vercellina, Comasina e Nuova. Libreria Meravigli, Milano 1993, pp. 196–197

Buildings and structures completed in 1872
Sass
Intesa Sanpaolo buildings and structures
Tourist attractions in Milan
19th-century architecture in Italy